Jim Kramer (born 1958) won the 2006 United States Scrabble Open in Phoenix, Arizona. Kramer has competed in 15 U.S. championship Scrabble tournaments and has represented the U.S. at the World Scrabble Championships six times. Before winning the 2006 USSO, he had top-ten finishes in the national championships three times, in 1998, 2000, and 2005. His fifth-place finish at the 2003 World Championship (WSC) was the highest by any North American player that year. He finished third in 2001.

A resident of Roseville, Minnesota, Kramer is nicknamed "Gentleman Jim" in Scrabble circles. Since his career began in 1983, he has played at least 2,500 tournament games, winning about 64% of the time. While his total earnings are unknown, he has won a minimum of $54,000 in prize money.

On November 17, 2006, Kramer was invited to compete against "Genius", a computer Scrabble opponent running the newest version of RealNetworks' Scrabble. In a three-round "Man v. Machine" match that took place at the Westlake Mall in Seattle, Genius took the initial lead, winning the first game 466 to 419. Kramer came back to win the second game 417 to 406. The deciding, third game came down to the last play, and Kramer won it 442 to 441, taking home $10,000.

References

External links

Jim Kramer's NSA player profile
Complete details of Jim's "Man v. Machine" games .

1958 births
American Scrabble players
Living people
People from Roseville, Minnesota
Place of birth missing (living people)